Flavius Symmachus (fl. 522–526) was a Roman politician during the Ostrogothic kingdom in Italy.

Son of the philosopher Anicius Manlius Severinus Boethius and of Rusticiana (his aunts were Galla and Proba), he was the brother of Boethius, with whom he shared the consulate, chosen by the Ostrogothic court.

His father fell into disgrace with the Ostrogothic ruler and had his own property confiscated; at the death of king Theodoric the Great (526), these properties were given back to Boethius and Symmachus.

Notes

Bibliography 
         
 Jones, Arnold Hugh Martin, John Robert Martindale, John Morris, The Prosopography of the Later Roman Empire, "Fl. Symmachus 8", volume 2, Cambridge University Press, 1992, p. 1044.

6th-century Italo-Roman people
6th-century Roman consuls
People of the Ostrogothic Kingdom
Flavii
Imperial Roman consuls